Senator Kerrigan may refer to:

John E. Kerrigan (1908–1987), Massachusetts State Senate
Patrick Kerrigan (1928–1979), Senate of Ireland